The 2016 KNSB Dutch Single Distance Championships were held at the Thialf ice skating rink in Heerenveen from Sunday 27 December 2015 to Tuesday 29 December 2015. Although the tournament was held in 2015 it was the 2016 edition as it was part of the 2015–2016 speed skating season.

Schedule

Medalists

Men

Women

Source:

References

External links
 KNSB

Dutch Single Distance Championships
Single Distance Championships
2016 Single Distance
KNSB Dutch Single Distance Championships, 2016